The Honky Problem is a 1991 animated short film by Mike Judge. It features an original character, Inbred Jed, who is playing with his country music band somewhere in the desert by a trailer for a small audience of American white trash.

Like Mike Judge's early Beavis and Butt-Head shorts, the film was funded by Spike and Mike and shown on MTV's Liquid Television in the early 1990s. The cartoon is also available on Spike and Mike's Sick and Twisted Festival of Animation Volume One VHS.

Plot
The Honky Problem opens with Inbred Jed, a very emotional hillbilly, and his band The Little Bottom Boys (consisting of an upright bass player, steel guitar player, and himself on guitar), playing a honky tonk outdoors concert for a small group of similar white trash citizens in a Texas trailer park. Jed introduces himself and the band, bringing himself to tears explaining how good it is to be there, playing a concert. He performs one of his songs, "Long-Legged Woman".

After the song is finished, Jed tearfully proclaims how much he loves the song he just played, and performs it again. During the encore, a narrator warns the viewers that what they have just seen is real, and could have been avoided.  The narrator further urges viewers to check the Mormon church that they and their spouse are not related before having children, reminding everyone that "inbreeding is everybody's problem".

In other media
One character in the film, the one who yells "Play some Skynyrd, man!", was later named Dave and appeared in a few early Beavis and Butt-Head episodes, most notably the episode "Way Down Mexico Way".

The character Inbred Jed's only other appearance was in the opening titles for the first Beavis and Butt-Head short, Frog Baseball. Before the cartoon starts, there's an "Inbred Jed's Homemade Cartoons" title card styled like the MGM logo with country-western music playing and Inbred Jed giving a somewhat evil hillbilly cackle, animated similarly from the short's closing shot.

References

1991 short films
1990s American animated films
Films directed by Mike Judge
American animated short films
Mormonism in fiction
1990s animated short films
1991 animated films
1991 films
Films with screenplays by Mike Judge
Films about hillbillies
Films set in Texas